The 2008–09 football season in Belgium, which is the 106th season of competitive football in the country.

Honours

League competitions

Belgian First Division

Belgian Second Division

European Club Results
Note that the Belgian team's score is given first

As Cercle Brugge did not desire to play in the Intertoto Cup, Germinal Beerschot took their place but where immediately eliminated. Anderlecht  suffered a painful defeat to BATE Borisov in the second qualification round of the Champions League, which did not even send them into the UEFA Cup. Gent also performed weak, losing immediately in their first match. Club Brugge got into the group stage but after drawing in every match against mostly weaker opponents, they finally succumbed at home to Copenhagen. Champions Standard Liège however provided stunning football as they came very close to keeping Liverpool out of the Champions League and then dropped into the UEFA Cup where they beat teams such as Everton, Sevilla, Partizan and Sampdoria before eventually going out against Braga in the last 16.

European qualification for 2008–09 summary

See also
 Jupiler League 2008-09
 Belgian Cup 2008-09
 2009 Belgian Super Cup
 Belgian Second Division
 Belgian Third Division A
 Belgian Third Division B

References